The 1975 Mason Review was a review of UK defence policy conducted by the Labour Government's Secretary of State for Defence, Roy Mason. The review was influenced by a Government decision to reduce the defence budget to 4.5% of Gross Domestic Product. The review was intended to anticipate defence needs during the period 1975–1985.

Summary 
The report made clear that despite the process of East−West Détente which was then gathering pace, the principle threat to the security of the UK remained the Soviet Union. Priority for UK defence resources was given to NATO commitments.

This led to four capabilities being emphasised in the review:

UK contribution to NATO front-line forces in Germany, including the British Army on the Rhine.
Anti-submarine warfare forces in the eastern Atlantic
Home defence
UK nuclear deterrent

To support this focus on Cold War theatres, most British forces in the Mediterranean Sea were to be reduced, and there were to be further reductions in the Far East.

See also
1966 Defence White Paper
1981 Defence White Paper
Options for Change (1990 restructuring)
Military of the United Kingdom

References

External links
 Draft Copy of 1975 Defence Review

1975 documents
History of the Labour Party (UK)
Defence white papers
United Kingdom defence procurement
1975 in British politics
1975 in military history
20th-century military history of the United Kingdom